Diogo Soares Gomes (born September 12, 1985), known as Diogo Gomes, is a Brazilian footballer currently playing for Pro Duta FC.

He previously played for clubs including Académica de Coimbra.

References

1985 births
Living people
Brazilian footballers
J. Malucelli Futebol players
Associação Académica de Coimbra – O.A.F. players
Primeira Liga players
Brazilian expatriate footballers
Expatriate footballers in Portugal

Association football midfielders